Schizoeupsalis promissa is a species of weavil in the Brentidae family. It can be found in New Guinea and neighbouring islands. Beetles of this species present great individual variation.

References 

 Alessandra Sforzi The Straight-snouted Weevils (Coleoptera: Curculionoidea, Brentidae) of Papua Indonesia
 E. Zimmerman (1994) Australian Weevils (Coleoptera: Curculionoidea) II: Brentidae
 Universal Biological Indexer

Brentidae
Beetles described in 1872
Taxa named by Francis Polkinghorne Pascoe